The Torres-Benedito Column was a militia column that operated at the beginning of the Spanish Civil War.

History 
The column was created in Valencia shortly after the outbreak of the Spanish Civil War. It was made up of soldiers from the former regiments of the region, as well as volunteers from the CNT, UGT, POUM, Syndicalist Party and Valencian Left. In total, it grouped 3,180 troops, of whom 842 were military and 2335 were militiamen.  The leadership of these forces was in the hands of the anarchist Domingo Torres and the artillery lieutenant José Benedito Lleó, a member of the Valencian Left and a war delegate in the Popular Executive Committee of Valencia; while Torres acted as a kind of "political" delegate, Benedito performed the functions of military adviser.  Politically, the column had a partially anarchist preponderance. 

The column left Castellón on August 18, crossing the province of Teruel until they reached the Francoist lines around the city of Teruel,  taking positions in Villalba Baja and Corbalán.  During its existence it operated on the Teruel Front,  constituting one of the most important columns operating in the sector.  Later it was reinforced by the Iberia Column and the CNT 13 Column, leaving all these forces under the command of Jesús Velasco Echave - who replaced Benedito in September.  Later the column forces reached a total of 4,100 troops. 

It came to have its own publication, "Victoria", a newspaper that was published in Alfambra. 

In the spring of 1937 it was militarized and transformed into the 81st Mixed Brigade,  a process that arrived after some internal opposition.

References

Bibliography 
 
 
 
 
 
 

Defunct anarchist militant groups
Military units and formations of the Spanish Civil War
Confederal militias
Military units and formations established in 1936
Military units and formations disestablished in 1937